Ratnal is a village near the town of Anjar in the Anjar taluka of Kutch district in the Indian state of Gujarat.

Ratnal Has No.1 Ranking in Asia for most number of Trucks and Truck Owners.

History
 y RABARI.AND.AHIR people are believed to enter Ratnal for the first time. Ahirs are the majority in Ratnal now.

Earthquake of 26 January 2001 
The 2001 Gujarat earthquake occurred on 26 January 2001, India's 51st Republic Day, at 08:46 AM local time (3:16 UTC) and lasted for over two minutes. The earthquake reached a magnitude of between 7.6 and 7.7 on the moment magnitude scale and had a maximum felt intensity of X (Intense) on the Mercalli intensity scale.

The village was almost completely destroyed in the 26 January 2001 earthquake. It is estimated that 175 people died in the village on that day. Bill Clinton has previously visited the village.

Economy

The people are mainly involved in agriculture and transportation. Ahir women of Ratnal are famous for their embroidery and patch-work. According to an India Today survey Ratnal is the only village in world having more than 1414 trucks 454 Farms. People are mainly involved in transportation and cultivation of oil-seeds, cotton and other seasonal crops. Other smaller sources of employment are petrol pumps, tea stalls, pesticides sales. Some of the natives also work for the Indian Railways.Health Facility Ratnal has Primary health center from 1 April 2014 and also has 2 sub center

Marriages
The village presents a picture of paradox as both orthodoxy and modernity co-exists here. Mass child marriages take place among an influential section among the Ahir community, known as Ahir Paratharia. In 2009 around 235 child couples tied the nuptial knot. These marriages take place traditionally once a year on the thirteenth day of the month of Vaishakh of the indigenous calendar.

Schools
There are five schools in the village:
1. Ratnal Panchayati Prathamik Shala (Primary School for Boys)
2. Shri Krishna Pranami Kanya Vidyalay (Girls School) managed by Pranami sect
3. Vidya Bharati (Primary School managed by Vidya Bharati)
4. Peta Para Shala
5. Ratnal Government High School
6.Radhe Krishna Nagar Primary School
7 Ratnal ITI government iti
8 kvk ratnal

Railroad station

Ratnal is a railway station on Bhuj – Gandhidham railway line and Bhuj-Palanpur passenger train has a halt here. The station code is RUT.

References

Villages in Kutch district